Ghana competed at the 2014 Summer Youth Olympics, in Nanjing, China from 16 August to 28 August 2014.

Medalists

Athletics

Ghana qualified two athletes.

Qualification Legend: Q=Final A (medal); qB=Final B (non-medal); qC=Final C (non-medal); qD=Final D (non-medal); qE=Final E (non-medal)

Boys
Field Events

Girls
Track & road events

Badminton

Ghana was given a quota to compete by the tripartite committee.

Singles

Doubles

Beach Volleyball

Ghana qualified a boys' and girls' team by their performance at the CAVB Qualification Tournament.

Swimming

Ghana qualified two swimmers.

Boys

Girls

Weightlifting

Ghana was given a quota to compete in a girls' event by the tripartite committee.

Girls

References

2014 in Ghanaian sport
Nations at the 2014 Summer Youth Olympics
Ghana at the Youth Olympics